Joshua Ang Ser Kian (born 1 March 1989) is a former Mediacorp artiste from Singapore who starred alongside Shawn Lee in the film I Not Stupid and its sequel I Not Stupid Too.

Career
Ang began acting in 2001 and was one of four child actors who were cast by Jack Neo and his team in the box office hit I Not Stupid. He was cast in Homerun, another successful film. Ang soon rose to stardom and was cast in more films, including Nobody's Child. In 2008, after completing his National Service, Ang signed a contract with Mediacorp as a full-time artiste. Ang also starred in Mediacorp Channel 8's 180 episode drama, Your Hand in Mine.

On 15 July 2010, Ang announced that he would not be renewing his contract with Mediacorp to spend more time on his new startup, a recycling business, and with his family. 

In 2012, Joshua founded the online humour TV channel Reelity TV. He made a brief return to television in Unriddle 2 to reprise his role as Liu Shisan and in films We Not Naughty and Timeless Love.

Personal life
Ang attended Pasir Ris Secondary School. After completing his O Levels, he served out his National Service before joining Mediacorp on a full-time contract.

On 3 March 2018, Ang married Shannon Low, an air stewardess whom he met in 2010 while studying part-time for a Banking and Finance degree in Murdoch University. Their son, Jedaiah Leonhart was born on 1 August 2018. On 14 December 2020, Ang announced on his Instagram account that he decided to divorce Low without revealing the actual reason, and later specifying the divorce would be formalised in March 2021 when they are legally allowed to do so. After the news of the divorce came to public attention, both Ang and Low indicated that they would be taking legal actions against each other for allegations that they had raised of each other on their social media accounts.

In August 2021, Ang welcomed his second child, whom he fathered with an unnamed partner.

Filmography

Television

Films

Awards and nominations

References 

1989 births
Living people
Singaporean male film actors
Singaporean people of Hokkien descent
Male child actors
21st-century Singaporean male actors